Vladimir Pavlovich Belyaev (Kamianets-Podilskyi – 11 February 1990) was a Soviet and Russian writer born in Ukraine. He is famous for his trilogy The Old Fortress (Старая Крепость) about boys living in Kamenets-Podolsky during the Russian Civil War. The trilogy was written in 1937–1951 and was awarded the Stalin Prize of 1952.

External links
 Belyaev's works and short bio

1909 births
1990 deaths
20th-century Russian male writers
20th-century Ukrainian writers
People from Kamianets-Podilskyi
People from Kamenets-Podolsky Uyezd
Communist Party of the Soviet Union members
Stalin Prize winners
Knights of the Order of Polonia Restituta
Recipients of the Order of the Red Banner of Labour
Recipients of the Shevchenko National Prize
Russian children's writers
Socialist realism writers
Soviet children's writers
Soviet male writers
Ukrainian children's writers
Burials in Troyekurovskoye Cemetery